The Peru women's national under-23 volleyball team represents Peru in women's under-23 volleyball events, it is controlled and managed by the Peruvian Volleyball Federation that is a member of South American volleyball body Confederación Sudamericana de Voleibol (CSV) and the international volleyball body government the Fédération Internationale de Volleyball (FIVB).

Results

FIVB U23 World Championship
 Champions   Runners up   Third place   Fourth place

U23 Pan American Cup
 Champions   Runners up   Third place   Fourth place

South America U22 Championship
 Champions   Runners up   Third place   Fourth place

Team

Current squad
The following is the Peruvian roster in the 2022

Head Coach: Francisco Hervás

Notable players
Angela Leyva
Maguilaura Frias
Vivian Baella
Daniela Uribe
Andrea Urrutia
Clarivett Yllescas

References

External links
 ViveVoley.com

Volleyball
National women's under-23 volleyball teams
Volleyball in Peru